Eric Hilliard Nelson (May 8, 1940 – December 31, 1985), known professionally as Ricky Nelson until his 21st birthday when he officially dropped the "y" and simply became Rick Nelson, was an American singer-songwriter. His discography comprises 24 original studio albums, one original live album, various compilation and archival projects, and 94 singles.

Albums

Studio albums

Soundtrack

Lost studio albums

Live albums

Notable archival projects

Box sets

Compilation albums

Singles

Billboard Year-End performances

References

Country music discographies
 
 
Discographies of American artists
Rock music discographies